Elections to Barrow-in-Furness Borough Council were held on 4 May 2006. One third of the council was up for election and the Labour party lost overall control of the council to no overall control.

After the election, the composition of the council was
Labour 18
Conservative 17
Independent 2
People's Party 1

Election result

Ward results

References
2006 Barrow-in-Furness election result
Ward results

2006 English local elections
2006
2000s in Cumbria